Guaiqueríes de Margarita is a professional basketball team based in La Asunción, Venezuela. The team currently plays in Venezuela's Liga Profesional de Baloncesto. The team has won the Venezuelan championships nine times.

Current rosters 
LPB teams can only have three foreigners in the team.

Trophies
Venezuelan Champions: 9
1977, 1978, 1979, 1980, 1981, 1982, 1997, 2007, 2021-II

Notable players

 Darius Adams (2012)
 Josh Davis (2013)
 Renaldo Balkman (2013)
 José "Piculín" Ortiz (1997; 1998)
 Antoine Wright (2012; 2013)
  Askia Jones (1996−2001)
 Carl Herrera (2002−2004)
 Richard Lugo (2012−2016)
 Mike Hackett (1984–1985)
 Harold Keeling (1987)
 Dwayne Jones (2015–2016)
 Damian Cantrell (2003; 2005)
 Fred Vinson (2003; 2005)
 Rostin González (1991)
 Armando Becker (1990–1991; 1993–1994)
 Byron Larkin (1990–1991; 1993–1994)
 Ryan Forehan-Kelly (2004)

References

External links
Official Website
Team Profile at Latinbasket.com

Basketball teams established in 1977
Basketball teams in Venezuela
La Asunción